Dušan Vasiljević (born 7 May 1982) is a Serbian football player who most recently played for Budafoki MTE.

Honours
Champion 2010/11,🇭🇺 (Videoton) ! 2X Super Cup🇭🇺 (Videoton /Ujpest ) Újpest
Hungarian Cup (1): 2013–14

References

External links
 slavia.cz  
 

1982 births
Living people
Footballers from Belgrade
Serbian footballers
Association football midfielders
FK Kolubara players
FK Mogren players
FK Radnički Obrenovac players
Békéscsaba 1912 Előre footballers
Kaposvári Rákóczi FC players
FC Energie Cottbus players
SK Slavia Prague players
Újpest FC players
Fehérvár FC players
Nemzeti Bajnokság I players
Bundesliga players
Serbian expatriate footballers
Expatriate footballers in Montenegro
Expatriate footballers in Hungary
Expatriate footballers in Germany
Expatriate footballers in the Czech Republic
Serbian expatriate sportspeople in Montenegro
Serbian expatriate sportspeople in Hungary
Serbian expatriate sportspeople in Germany
Serbian expatriate sportspeople in the Czech Republic